The Kura-Aras Lowland, Kura-Aras Depression or Kura-Aras Basin is a vast depression in central-southern Azerbaijan defined by the valleys of the Kura River and Aras River. It is situated by the West shore of the Caspian Sea and is part of the Aral-Caspian Depression. It is delimited by the Greater Caucasus from the North, Lesser Caucasus from the West and the Talysh Mountains from the South. The name is derived from the names of the two rivers in the area: the Kura and the Aras.

See also
Kura–Araxes culture or Kur–Araz culture, Bronze Age culture from the region
Trans-Caucasus

References

Further reading 

Depressions of Azerbaijan
Caspian Sea basin
Depressions of Europe
Endorheic basins of Asia